La Diaria, also styled la diaria is a Uruguayan newspaper established in 2006. It is aligned with the independent left.

See also 

 Brecha
 Marcha (newspaper)

References

External links
 La Diaria

Newspapers published in Uruguay
Spanish-language newspapers
Publications established in 2006
2006 establishments in Uruguay
Mass media in Montevideo
Spanish-language websites